Westendorp is a surname. Notable people with the surname include:

Carlos Westendorp (born 1937), Spanish diplomat
Fiep Westendorp (1916–2004), Dutch illustrator
Gérard Daniel Westendorp (1813–1869), Belgian physician and botanist
Menno Westendorp (born 1969), Dutch cinematographer
Sven Westendorp (1969—2011), Dutch criminal, graffiti artist and designer

See also
Westendorp v R, a Supreme Court of Canada case